Lagaaam is a 1976 Bollywood film directed by Desh Gautam.

Cast
Yogeeta Bali   
Bindu   
Prem Chopra   
C.S. Dubey   
V. Gopal   
Farida Jalal   
Jankidas   
Satyendra Kapoor   
Vinod Khanna   
Ram Mohan   
Dina Pathak

Songs
"Aaj Pawan Ki Chal Chura Ke" - Lata Mangeshkar
"Jaise Moti Seep Se Bichhde" - Lata Mangeshkar
"Aadhi Aadhi Raat Meri Payaliya Bhaje" - Mohammed Rafi, Lata Mangeshkar
"Aa Idhar Aa Zara Nazar To Mil" - Asha Bhosle

External links
 

1976 films
1970s Hindi-language films
Films scored by Kalyanji Anandji